Vo Štvorici Po Opici is the second album by the Slovak punk rock/comedy rock band Horkýže Slíže, released in November 1998.

Track list

Personnel
 Peter Hrivňák (Kuko) – vocals, bass guitar
 Mário Sabo (Sabotér) – guitar, backing vocals
 Juraj Štefánik (Doktor) – guitar, backing vocals
 Martin Košovan (Košo) – drums

Guests
 Juraj Kupec - acoustic guitar and solo guitar, harmonica, balalaika, flute
 Mišo Kovalčík - acoustic guitar and solo guitar
 Marcela Cvrkalová, Ivana Poliačiková, Katka Malatincová a Mária Sabová - vocals

External links 
 Horkýže Slíže official website

1998 albums
Horkýže Slíže albums